Līksna Parish is an administrative unit of Augšdaugava Municipality in the Latgale region of Latvia (prior to 2009 the former Daugavpils District).

Towns, villages and settlements of Līksna Parish 
 Līksna

 
Parishes of Latvia
Latgale